Test Drive 4X4 (known as Test Drive Off-Road 2 in North America) is a racing video game co-developed by Accolade's internal development team and Pitbull Syndicate, and published by Accolade for PlayStation and Microsoft Windows.

Development
The game was announced in late 1997. Test Drive 4x4 uses the Test Drive 4 engine and includes licensed off-road vehicles. Accolade spent $3 million on a television advertising campaign for Test Drive 5 and Test Drive Off-Road 2.

Reception

The game received "mixed" reviews on both platforms according to the review aggregation website GameRankings. In Japan, where the PlayStation version was ported and published by Capcom on 8 April 1999, Famitsu gave it a score of 25 out of 40.

References

External links

1998 video games
Accolade (company) games
Multiplayer and single-player video games
Off-road racing video games
PlayStation (console) games
Off-Road 2
Video game sequels
Video games developed in the United Kingdom
Windows games